Ritzville is a city in Adams County, Washington, United States. The population was 1,767 at the 2020 census. It is the county seat of Adams County. The city is part of the Othello, WA Micropolitan Area, which comprises all of Adams County, and is part of the larger Moses Lake-Othello, WA Combined Statistical Area.

History
The first settler in what would become modern Ritzville was William McKay in 1880. The town would be named after Phillip Ritz, who had settled nearby two years earlier. By December 1880, Ritzville's town-site had been platted by John W. Sprague on behalf of his company, The Northern Pacific Railway. In 1881, McKay built the first house on the townsite. The Northern Pacific grade was under construction in the vicinity and McKay's home was used as a makeshift hotel for the workers and associated transients.

With the railroad came a new wave of settlers to the area. In the summer of 1881, McKay erected the first store and the railroad built a depot nearby, which also served as a hotel, theater and meeting hall. At that time the fledgeling village had a population of around 50 and the school consisted of a lean-to against a house. The town's water supply was the railroad tank because it was not thought that water could be found in the ground. The first religious services were held in Adams County in Ritzville in April 1882 at the McKay Home and the First Congregational Church was soon organized, a church would be built in 1885. The post office was established in 1883 by J.L. Johnson of Walla Walla who also purchased McKay's store. Soon afterwards, many more businesses would set up shop in town. As the 1880s wore on, the town was beginning to realize its position as a major wheat shipping point in the Big Bend Country and it continued to grow.

When the town's water supply from the railroad tank began to stretch thin, a search for underground water was initiated. Most of the land-owners in town agreed to move towards the well, with the exception of a large hotel which couldn't be moved. Water was eventually found at the site and the town was allowed to stay where it was. By 1887, Ritzville had three general merchandise stores, one drug store, one saloon, two blacksmith shops, two lumber yards, two livery stables, one harness shop, two hotels and a large, two-story wooden schoolhouse with an attendance of 100.

On June 6, 1888, a fire caused by a defective flue wiped out nearly all of the business section of town. Ritzville had no fire department at the time and its citizens were unable to combat the flames effectively. Rebuilding went underway quickly resulting in the town's first brick building in 1889 built by the town's first mayor, N.H. Greene. It still stands and is currently part of the Ritzville Historic District.

Following the rebuilding from the fire, Ritzville was incorporated as a town in 1888 and was officially re-incorporated as a city on July 17, 1890 after Washington became a state. The first banking institution, The Adams County Bank (later First National Bank) would follow in April 1891. After another downtown fire in 1894, a waterworks system was installed at a cost of $20,000. The first permanent Adams County courthouse was also built in 1892.

After the panic of 1893 had subsided in 1898, Ritzville was experiencing another boom, with demand for property rising and scores of buildings being built. Telephone service was established in August 1899. By the turn of the century, the population had exceeded 1,200. The town finally received a volunteer fire department in 1901, with equipment funded by the citizens. Also in 1901, Ritzville received the title of the greatest wheat shipping point in the world. Between August of that year and August 1902, approximately 1,967,725 bushels of wheat were received in Ritzville warehouses for shipment and 1,990 rail cars of wheat and flour were billed out. These numbers would only be exceeded in 1902. On January 17, 1902, Ritzville was electrified for the first time, run by a steam-powered dynamo. The Chamber of Commerce was formed in 1903 and the following year the courthouse was doubled in size. The city received a Carnegie Library in 1907, the only one in Adams County. It still serves as the town's library today.

By the time of The Great Depression, growth had slowed and Ritzville settled in as a small town. In the 1960s Interstate 90 was constructed around the south-end of town, replacing U.S. Route 10 and re-routing US 395 (WA) and its traffic away from downtown. The town's arrested development from then on helped contribute to its charm, helping form The Ritzville Historic District in 1990.

Much of the history of Ritzville and Adams County is visually documented in the A.M. Kendrick collection.  This archive of images, illustrating daily life in eastern Washington state, was originally maintained by the Adams County Rural Library District No. 2 (formerly Ritzville Public Library), and now is kept in digital form in the Washington State Digital Archives.

Geography

Demographics

2010 census
As of the census of 2010, there were 1,673 people, 751 households, and 444 families residing in the city. The racial makeup of the city was 94.5% White, 0.1% African American, 0.8% Native American, 0.5% Asian, 2.4% from other races, and 1.7% from two or more races. Hispanic or Latino of any race were 5.7% of the population.

There were 751 households, of which 23.0% had children under the age of 18 living with them, 46.1% were married couples living together, 8.7% had a female householder with no husband present, 4.4% had a male householder with no wife present, and 40.9% were non-families. 36.2% of all households were made up of individuals, and 18% had someone living alone who was 65 years of age or older. The average household size was 2.15 and the average family size was 2.75.

The median age in the city was 48.1 years. 20.6% of residents were under the age of 18; 6.4% were between the ages of 18 and 24; 19.2% were from 25 to 44; 30.5% were from 45 to 64; and 23.3% were 65 years of age or older. The gender makeup of the city was 48.8% male and 51.2% female.

2000 census
As of the census of 2000, there were 1,736 people, 777 households, and 470 families residing in the city. The population density was 1,347.8 people per square mile (198.4/km2). There were 873 housing units at an average density of 677.8 per square mile (261.3/km2). The racial makeup of the city was 95.79% White, 0.35% African American, 0.58% Native American, 0.58% Asian, 0.86% from other races, and 1.84% from two or more races. Hispanic or Latino of any race were 2.36% of the population.

There were 777 households, out of which 24.1% had children under the age of 18 living with them, 48.5% were married couples living together, 8.9% had a female householder with no husband present, and 39.4% were non-families. 36.4% of all households were made up of individuals, and 17.6% had someone living alone who was 65 years of age or older. The average household size was 2.15 and the average family size was 2.75.

In the city, the age distribution of the population shows 21.7% under the age of 18, 5.1% from 18 to 24, 21.8% from 25 to 44, 26.3% from 45 to 64, and 25.1% who were 65 years of age or older. The median age was 46 years. For every 100 females, there were 93.5 males. For every 100 females age 18 and over, there were 86.3 males.

The median income for a household in the city was $32,560, and the median income for a family was $40,240. Males had a median income of $32,500 versus $21,083 for females. The per capita income for the city was $18,308. About 8.4% of families and 14.3% of the population were below the poverty line, including 20.1% of those under age 18 and 8.6% of those age 65 or over.

Climate
Ritzville experiences a semi-arid climate (Köppen BSk). Annual precipitation averages 11.9 in (30.2 cm). Annual snowfall averages just under .

Points of interest

Five individual structures in Ritzville are on the National Register of Historic Places:  The Burroughs (Dr. Frank R.) House on Main Street, the Northern Pacific Railroad Depot, the Greene (Nelson H.) House on South Adams Street, the Ritzville Carnegie Library on West Main Street, and the Ritzville High School (also known as Old Ritzville High School) on Seventh Avenue. The Burroughs House and the National Pacific Depot have both been ceded to the city and maintained as museums by volunteers.  The Ritzville Historic District, bounded roughly by Broadway, Division Street, Railroad Avenue, and Washington Street is also listed on the register.

The New Ritz Theatre was opened in 1937 and was designed by prolific northwest cinema architect Bjarne Moe.  It maintains the original architecture and seating arrangement for 400 patrons.

Ritzville is currently home to the biggest annual rodeo in eastern Washington.

In popular culture
Seattle Grunge band Mudhoney recorded a song named after Ritzville on their 1992 album, Piece of Cake.

Notes

References
 An Illustrated History of The Big Bend Country, Embracing Lincoln, Douglas, Adams and Franklin Counties. Spokane, Washington: Western Historical Publishing Company, 1904. Print.
 Kirk, Ruth and Carmela Alexander (1990, revised 1995) Exploring Washington's Past: a road guide to history (Revised Edition), University of Washington Press, Seattle.

External links

 City of Ritzville website
 Ritzville - Thumbnail History, HistoryLink
 Ritzville Heritage. Local history collections from the Ritzville Public Library and Adams County Historical Society.

Cities in Washington (state)
Cities in Adams County, Washington
County seats in Washington (state)